Microlechia lycia is a moth in the family Gelechiidae. It was described by Hou-Hun Li in 2001. It is found in Korea and Shaanxi, China.

The wingspan is 10–11 mm. Adults are similar to Microlechia iranica, but can be distinguished by the male and female genitalia.

The larvae feed on Lycium barbarum.

References

Microlechia
Moths described in 2001